Anna Berg (born 25 April 1973) is a Swedish professional golfer who played on the Ladies European Tour. She was 1997 LET Rookie of the Year and runner-up at the Taiwan Ladies Open in 2001.

Amateur career
Berg was on the National Team and won silver at the inaugural European Girls' Team Championship in 1991 together with Maria Hjorth, Mia Löjdahl and Charlotta Sörenstam. In 1994, she won the European Lady Junior's Team Championship with the same teammates plus Linda Ericsson and Helena Olsson. She was a member of the Swedish team at the 1995 European Ladies' Team Championship in Italy, and she teamed up with Sara Eklund and Mia Löjdahl for the 1996 Espirito Santo Trophy, held in the Philippines.

Individually, she finished third at the 1996 European Ladies Amateur Championship, two strokes behind Silvia Cavalleri, and won the 1996 French International Ladies Amateur Championship.

Berg won three tournaments on the Swedish Golf Tour (SGT), feeder tour for the Ladies European Tour, while still an amateur, including the 1996 SM Match Play.

Professional career
Berg turned professional in 1997 and joined the Ladies European Tour, where she finished 30th on the Order of Merit to claim the LET Rookie of the Year Award. Her best finish her rookie season was tied 4th at the Ladies Swiss Open.

On the 2001 Ladies European Tour, she was runner-up at the Taiwan Ladies Open in Portugal, one stroke behind Raquel Carriedo, and finished 21st on the Order of Merit.

In 2005 and 2006, she won four SGT tournaments, including successfully navigating playoffs against Anna Nordqvist and Caroline Hedwall.

Amateur wins
1996 French International Ladies Amateur Championship

Source:

Professional wins (7)

Swedish Golf Tour (7)

Team appearances
Amateur
European Girls' Team Championship (representing Sweden): 1991
European Lady Junior's Team Championship (representing Sweden): 1994 (winners)
European Ladies' Team Championship (representing Sweden): 1995
Espirito Santo Trophy (representing Sweden): 1996

References

External links

Swedish female golfers
Ladies European Tour golfers
Sportspeople from Skåne County
People from Kristianstad Municipality
1973 births
Living people